The 1933 South Dakota State Jackrabbits football team was an American football team that represented South Dakota State University in the North Central Conference (NCC) during the 1933 college football season. In its sixth season under head coach Cy Kasper, the team compiled a 6–3 record and outscored opponents by a total of 118 to 72.

Schedule

References

South Dakota State
South Dakota State Jackrabbits football seasons
South Dakota State Jackrabbits football